John Adickes (born June 29, 1964) is a former American football center. He played for the Chicago Bears from 1987 to 1988 and for the Minnesota Vikings in 1989.

References

1964 births
Living people
Sportspeople from Queens, New York
Players of American football from New York City
American football centers
Baylor Bears football players
Chicago Bears players
Minnesota Vikings players